Nizhnyaya Kamenka is a rural locality (a settlement) in Nizhnekamenskoye Rural Settlement, Talovsky District, Voronezh Oblast, Russia. The population was 462 as of 2010. There are 4 streets.

Geography 
Nizhnyaya Kamenka is located 10 km east of Talovaya (the district's administrative centre) by road. Uchastok №4 is the nearest rural locality.

References 

Rural localities in Talovsky District